Proseicela is a genus of leaf beetles.

Taxonomy
The genus Proseicela Chevrolat is assigned to the Chrysomelidae beetle tribe Chrysomelini (in subfamily Chrysomelinae). A single species has been sampled in the molecular-based phylogeny of Chrysomelinae.

Species
Proseicela antennalis (Kirsch, 1883)
Proseicela bicruciata Jacoby
Proseicela bivittata
Proseicela boliviensista
Proseicela egensis Stal, 1869
Proseicela ecuadoriensis (Jacoby, 1903)?
Proseicela flavipennis
Proseicela maculata
Proseicela signifera
Proseicela spectabilis (Baly)
Proseicela vittata (Fabricius)

Behaviour
Maternal guarding (a form of subsociality) of small broods of eggs and larvae is known in P. bivittata and in P. vittata in French Guiana, P. bicruciata  in Ecuador, P. spectabilis in Ecuador, and an unidentified species, Proseicela sp. in Ecuador.

References

Chrysomelidae genera
Chrysomelinae
Taxa named by Louis Alexandre Auguste Chevrolat